Knud Morten Lange (24 November 1919 – 10 November 2003) was a Danish mycologist and politician. He was son the mycologist Jakob E. Lange. He was professor of botany at the University of Copenhagen 1958-1989 and university vice chancellor 1976–1979. Early in his career, he established his name in arctic mycology, starting with his first expedition to Greenland in 1946. His studies of mating and intersterility in basidiomycetes are now classical. Later, his active research career succumbed to the burden of many administrative and political commitments. He nevertheless authored a number of popular mushroom books, which have been translated to several languages.
Politically, Lange was first member of the Communist Party of Denmark, but during the 1950s he got into open conflict with the party executives and co-founded the Socialist People's Party in 1959. He was member of the parliament (Folketinget) for that party 1960–1976. He was a public proponent of nuclear energy as chairman of the state Energy Council (1976–1987).

References

1919 births
2003 deaths
Danish communists
Danish mycologists
20th-century Danish botanists
Members of the Folketing
University of Copenhagen alumni
Academic staff of the University of Copenhagen
Rectors of the University of Copenhagen